Hymns for the Broken, Swollen, and Silent is the tenth studio album by Gnaw Their Tongues. On December 9, 2016 it was released on vinyl by Consouling Sounds and on cassette by Tartarus Records. It was released on CD by Crucial Blast on December 16, 2016

Track listing

References 

2016 albums
Gnaw Their Tongues albums